GK Films is a British-American film and television production company founded in 1990 by Graham King, located in Santa Monica, California. In 2005, the firm, which was known as Initial Entertainment Group at that time, signed a deal with Warner Bros.

In 2012, GK signed a new deal with Warner Bros. Pictures.

In June 2016, Revolution Studios acquired the worldwide rights to five of GK Films' productions: Hugo, The Tourist, Edge of Darkness, The Rum Diary and The Young Victoria.

In August 2017, GK signed a three-year first-look deal with Paramount Pictures.

Filmography

As GK Films
 The Young Victoria (2009)
 Edge of Darkness (2010)
 The Town (2010)
 London Boulevard (2010)
 The Tourist (2010)
 Rango (2011)
 The Rum Diary (2011)
 Hugo (2011)
 In the Land of Blood and Honey (2011)
 Dark Shadows (2012)
 Argo (2012)
 World War Z (2013)
 Jersey Boys (2014)
 The 5th Wave (2016)
 Allied (2016)
 Tomb Raider (2018)
 Delirium (2018)
 Bohemian Rhapsody (2018)
 The Unforgivable (2021)
 Michael (upcoming film)
 Untitled Bee Gees film

As Initial Entertainment Group
 Liebestraum (1991)
 Rent-a-Kid (1995)
 Little City (1997)
 Family Plan (1997)
 Changing Habits (1997)
 Walking Thunder (1997)
 Montana (1998)
 Savior (1998)
 Very Bad Things (1998)
 Traffic (2000)
 Dr. T & the Women (2000)
 Ali (2001)
 The Dangerous Lives of Altar Boys (2002)
 Gangs of New York (2002)
 Laws of Attraction (2004)
 The Aviator (2004)
 The Ballad of Jack and Rose (2005)
 An Unfinished Life (2005)
 The Departed (2006)
 Blood Diamond (2006)
 Next (2007)
 Gardener of Eden (2007)
 Bangkok Dangerous (2008)

Television work

As GK-TV
 Camelot (2011)

References

External links
 

Companies based in Santa Monica, California
Film production companies of the United Kingdom
Mass media companies established in 1990
Television production companies of the United Kingdom